The Green Island is an artificial island in Kuwait, off the coast of Kuwait City's promenade. 

It was opened in 1988 and became a tourist attraction. It is the first artificial island in the Persian Gulf region. It is also a waterside park with picnicking areas.

In 2023 Kuwait announced the Green Island Season in celebration of the 62nd National Day and 32nd Liberation Day. The Season was developed by the Touristic Enterprise Company (TEC). The Season opened it's doors in the 12th of February, 2023. 

In this season the island set up many restaurants, cafés, games, and other entertainment facilities. The TEC, in cooperation with Zain, also hosted one of the largest drone show in Kuwait's history. Using 2,000 Drones to make displays of Kuwait's history, present, and future.

Gallery

See also
 List of islands of Kuwait

References

1988 establishments in Kuwait
Tourist attractions in Kuwait
Islands of Kuwait
Parks in Kuwait
Artificial islands of Asia
Entertainment venues in Kuwait